Christopher Yvon (11 November 1969 – 26 October 2022) was the Permanent Representative of the United Kingdom to the Council of Europe since February 2016 and Chair of the Committee of the Parties of the Council of Europe Convention on Action against Trafficking in Human Beings.

He was HM Ambassador to North Macedonia (2010–2014), led the British Embassy in Slovenia from 2014–2015, and was Chargé d'Affaires to Slovenia (2014 to 2015). 

In 2021, he took up a new posting in the Open Societies and Human Rights Directorate, at the Foreign and Commonwealth Office. 

Yvon died on 26 October 2022, at the age of 52.

References

1969 births
2022 deaths
Ambassadors of the United Kingdom to North Macedonia